Maximilian Kappler (born 1 October 1997 in Lichtenstein) is a German motorcycle racer. He competes in Supersport 300 World Championship aboard a KTM RC390. He was the IDM Moto3 champion in 2013.

Career statistics

Grand Prix motorcycle racing

By season

Races by year
(key) (Races in bold indicate pole position; races in italics indicate fastest lap)

References

External links

1997 births
Living people
German motorcycle racers
Moto3 World Championship riders
Supersport 300 World Championship riders